P. K. Kunhalikutty (born 1 June 1951 as Pandikkadavath Kunhalikutty) is an Indian politician and social worker who is the present Member of Legislative Assembly from Vengara Assembly Constituency in Kerala. He also serves as National General Secretary of Indian Union Muslim League (IUML) and Deputy Leader of opposition in Kerala Leglative Assembly. 

Kunhalikutty was born at Oorakam in Malabar district, Madras State in 1951. He entered public life through students and college union politics and served as Chairman of Malappuram Municipality at the age of 29 in 1980. He was elected to the Kerala state Legislative Assembly for the first time from the Malappuram Constituency in 1982. He went on to become Member of Legislative Assembly of Kerala eight times between 1982 and 2021. He also served as Minister for Industries in several Kerala Legislative Assemblies (under Congress leaders K. Karunakaran, A. K. Antony and Oommen Chandy). Kunhalikutty served as Kerala State General Secretary of Indian Union Muslim League from 2003 - 2006 and from 2007  -  2011.

Kunhalikutty is popularly known as "Kunjappa" among his supporters. He is known for his deep 'bonding' to United Democratic Front, the decades-old Congress-led pre-poll alliance in Kerala. As per Malayala Manorama daily, "the persuasive charm" of Kunhalikutty is widely respected by his political peers and rivals. He is also known for his 'vast experience in crafting strategic moves', and having 'weathered many a storm in his political career' . The Outlook magazine once described Kunhalikutty as "Indian Union Muslim League's backbone in Kerala politics."

Background and career 
P. K. Kunhalikutty was born on 1 June 1951  at Oorakam, Melmuri in present-day Malappuram District as the son of Pandikkadavath Mohamed Haji and  K. P. Fathima Kutty. He completed his secondary education from G. V. H. S. S. Vengara. He has an under-graduate degree in Commerce from Sir Syed College, Taliparamba. He was also educated at Farook College, Kozhikode. He is also a Post-Graduate Diploma holder in Business Management.

Personal life 
Kunhalikutty is married to K. M. Ummul Kulza and the couple have two children. He spends his spare time in vegetable cultivation at a plot near his residence and in ornamental fish farming.

The chairman of Koyenco Group, P. P. Koya, is brother-in-law of P. K. Kunhalikutty.

Political career
Kunhalikutty is also the National General Secretary of Indian Union Muslim League (IUML). He earlier served as Kerala State General Secretary,  Indian Union Muslim League from 2003 - 2006 and 2007 - 2011. He was National Treasurer, Indian Union Muslim League. 

He is also serving presently as Director, Chandrika daily and Director, Muhammed Koya International Foundation. From May 2016 to April 2017, he served as Deputy Leader of Opposition, Kerala Legislative Assembly.

1980 Malappuram Municipality chairman 
Kunhalikutty entered politics through Muslim Students Federation (the MSF), the student wing of Indian Union Muslim League. He later became State Treasurer, Muslim Students Federation. He also served as Secretary, Farook College Students Union.

He subsequently served as Chairman, Malappuram Municipality - at the age of 29 - in 1980. The Indian Express later wrote, "he became the blue-eyed boy of the [respected] Panakkad Thangal family after displaying political acumen and charisma upon being elected Malappuram Municipality chairman in 1980". Rise of Kunhalikutty in Indian Union Muslim League after the 1980 victory was later described by the media as "meteoric".

Tenures in Kerala Legislative Assembly 
Kunhalikutty has been elected to Kerala Legislative Assembly eight times, in 1982 and 1987, contesting from Malappuram Assembly Constituency, and in 1991, 1996 and 2001, from Kuttippuram Constituency and in 2011, 2016 and 2021 from Vengara Constituency. In the 2006 Left Democratic Front wave in Kerala, Kunhalikutty was defeated by K.T. Jaleel in Kuttippuram Constituency.

Career as Minister for Industries  
Kunhalikutty served as Minister for Industries and Social Welfare from 1991 to 1995 in the K. Karunakaran Ministry (1991-95).  As per observers, the selection was an indication of senior leader K. Karunakaran's regard for the "young League politician".

Kunhalikutty went on to serve as Minister for Industries and Municipalities from 1995 to 1996, and Minister for Industries, IT and Social Welfare from 2001 to 2004, in two A. K. Antony Ministries and Minister for Industries, IT and Social Welfare, from 2004 to 2005 in the Oommen Chandy Ministry. In 2011 he was the wealthiest member in the cabinet of Oommen Chandy.

Member of Parliament 
Kunhalikutty got elected as Member of Parliament from Malappuram Parliamentary Constituency in 2017 in a by-election. The election was a result of the death of former Minister of State for External Affairs and senior IUML leader E. Ahamed. Kunhalikutty won from all the seven Assembly constituencies of the Parliament Constituency. He was re-elected to Malappuram during the 2019 general elections. 

He was a member of Standing Committee on Railways, Government of India. From May 2017 to January 2018, he was a member in Committee on Government Assurances, Government of India.

Return to Legislative Assembly 
In February 2021, Kunhalikutty resigned from the Lok Sabha to contest the 2021 Kerala Legislative Assembly election. He is currently a Member of Legislative Assembly from Vengara Assembly Constituency.

Controversies 
P. K. Kunhalikutty experienced electoral defeat only in 2006 Kerala state assembly elections due to his involvement in the 1997 Ice cream parlour sex scandal. A closure report in the case was filed in the trial court later by the Special Investigation Team. There were severe allegations levelled in relation to this case including death of two girls in Kozhikode. The Supreme Court of India had in 2016 dismissed a petition from the opposition communists seeking a federal probe into the case.

There were allegations in relation to 2020 Kerala gold smuggling case that one of the key accused, K.T. Ramees is a relative of P.K. Kunhalikutty.

He skipped Lok Sabha session and was attending a marriage in Dubai when parliamentary proceedings over Triple Talaq abolition bill were taking place.    

In 2011, there was plea before Vigilance and Anti Corruption Bureau Court, Thrissur made by Andul Aziz from National Secular Conference to undertake a probe into wealth amassed by P.K. Kunhalikutty and his relatives. The plea had mention about investments made into Seashore Rolling Engineering Company owned by son of P.K. Kunhalikutty. The plea was dismissed by the VACB court due to inadequate evidences to support the claim.

See also 

 Indian Union Muslim League

References

Living people
Malayali politicians
People from Malappuram district
1951 births
Indian Union Muslim League politicians
Kerala MLAs 1982–1987
Kerala MLAs 1987–1991
Kerala MLAs 1996–2001
Kerala MLAs 2016–2021
India MPs 2014–2019
Lok Sabha members from Kerala
India MPs 2019–present